Guitarras Hermanas is the first album released by the flamenco-influenced Latin guitar instrumental duo Lara & Reyes. The most successful single from this album was "Cielo Sin Nubes" (Uncloudy Sky).

Track listing
"Cielo Sin Nubes (Uncloudy Sky)" – 3:57
"Sabor a Mi (A Taste of Me)" – 3:36
"Viene Clareando (Becoming Clear)" – 2:46
"Barrios de San Antonio (Neighborhoods of San Antonio)" – 3:48
"Bajo las Sombras (Beneath the Shadows)" – 3:47
"Besos Rosas (Pink Kisses)" – 4:17
"Ojos de Mar (Eyes of the Sea)" – 4:10
"Cotton Candy" – 4:30
"Lejos de Aqui (Far Away)" – 5:26
"Waltz for John and Paco" – 4:25

References

1995 debut albums
Lara & Reyes albums
Higher Octave albums